Miguel Ángel Aguayo López (born 20 August 1951) is a Mexican politician affiliated with the Mexican party PRI. He currently serves as Deputy of the LXII Legislature of the Mexican Congress representing Colima.

References

1951 births
Living people
Politicians from Colima City
Members of the Chamber of Deputies (Mexico) for Colima
Institutional Revolutionary Party politicians
21st-century Mexican politicians
Mexican surgeons
Universidad Autónoma de Guadalajara alumni
University of Colima alumni
Academic staff of the Autonomous University of Baja California
Academic staff of the University of Colima
Heads of universities and colleges in Mexico
Politicians from Colima
Deputies of the LXII Legislature of Mexico